Count Isaac de Camondo (born 3 July 1851 in Istanbul; died 7 April 1911 in Paris) was a member of the House of Camondo noted primarily as an art collector, with a noteworthy interest in the then "avant-garde" artists of the Impressionist and Post-Impressionist movements.

He inherited the principal role in the family's banking business in 1889, but did not display interest in the bank's development and closed its Istanbul operations in 1894. He was also a skilled amateur composer. 

A generous philanthropist who did not insist on giving his name to initiatives he sponsored, he was instrumental in the creation of the Société des amis du Louvre and in the establishment of the Théâtre des Champs-Élysées by Gabriel Astruc.

References 

Isaac
French art collectors
Jewish art collectors
French bankers
19th-century French Sephardi Jews
1851 births
1911 deaths
Turkish Sephardi Jews